Tim Kasten  (born 27 January 1983) is a German international rugby union player, playing for the Heidelberger RK in the Rugby-Bundesliga and the German national rugby union team. He made his debut for Germany in a game against Sweden in 2004.

Kasten was born in Hannover, and has played rugby since 1986, first for the SV 08 Ricklingen and later, after the club was unable to field a youth team, for the SC Germania List. In 2003–04 he spent a season with DSV 78 Hannover but left the club when it faced financial trouble, to join RG Heidelberg, where he won two German championships with the club, before moving to England, where he played for the Southend RFC. In 2009–10, he returned to Germany, after suffering from injuries in England, and now plays for Heidelberger RK.

Kasten has also played for the Germany's 7's side in the past, like at the 2008 and 2009 Hannover Sevens and the 2009 London Sevens. He was also part of the German Sevens side at the World Games 2005 in Duisburg, where Germany finished 8th.

Tim Kasten is considered to be one of the best German rugby players, his father Ralf having played for Germany, too.

In 2011, Kasten extended his contract with HRK for another three seasons. In January 2013 he announced his retirement from the German national team, having played 34 times for the German XV.

Honours

Club
 German rugby union championship
 Champions: 2006, 2007, 2010, 2011, 2012
 German rugby union cup
 Winner: 2004, 2011
 German sevens championship
 Champions: 2003, 2005, 2008

National team
 European Nations Cup - Division 2
 Champions: 2008

Stats
Tim Kasten 's personal statistics in club and international rugby:

Club

 As of 11 May 2012

National team

European Nations Cup

Friendlies & other competitions

 As of 27 April 2013

References

External links
 Tim Kasten at scrum.com
   Tim Kasten at totalrugby.de
  Tim Kasten at the Hannover Sevens website
  Tim Kasten at the DRV website

1983 births
Living people
Sportspeople from Hanover
German rugby union players
Germany international rugby union players
DSV 78 Hannover players
RG Heidelberg players
Heidelberger RK players
Rugby union flankers
German expatriate sportspeople in England

bjn:Tim Kasten
min:Tim Katen
su:Tim Kasten